Bragge is a surname. Notable people with the surname include:

 Charles Bragge (1754–1831), English politician, changed name to Charles Bathurst in 1804
 James Bragge (1833–1908), English-born New Zealand photographer
 William Bragge (1823–1884), English engineer, antiquarian and author

See also
 Bragg (surname)
 Braggs (disambiguation)